Reflecting the religious constitution of the population, a large number of Hindu temples and Christian churches dot the townscape of Kottayam district. Some of them are the Thirunakkara Mahadeva temple, Kumaranalloor Devi temple, Thiruvarrpu Sri Krishna Temple, Thaliyil Mahadeva Temple, Pallippurathukavu Bhagavathi Temple, Elia Cathedral (thronal Cathedral of the Catholicos of the East), Kottayam Valiya Pally, Manarcad Cathedral, Cheriya Palli, CSI Holy Trinity cathedral, Puthuppally St. George Church and Thazhathangadi Juma Masjid. All the temples of Kottayam were also built under royal patronage of Hinduism during the 2nd millennium.

Thirunakkara Temple
Thirunakkara Mahadeva temple, at the heart of the town, is a Shiva temple built in the Kerala style of temple architecture, with interior murals depicting themes from the Hindu epics. It was built at the beginning of the 16th century by the then Raja of Thekkumkur. The annual temple festival that culminates in a ceremony called the Aaraattu, attracts large number of devotees. The other famous temples include the Ettumanoor and Vaikom temples dedicated to Lord Shiva and a temple dedicated to Goddess Saraswathi at Panachikkad (also known as Dakshina-Mookaambika). All these temples are rich in lore and festivities and attract a large number of pilgrims from all over the country.

Kumaranalloor Temple
Kumaranalloor Devi temple, located near the banks of Meenachil River is famous for its cultural heritage. The sreekovil is beautifully illustrated with Mural Paintings. Karthika, the birth star of Devi is celebrated in the ninth day of the 10 Day long temple festival attracts lot of pilgrims from all over the country. Kumaranallor and nearby place Kudamaloor is also famous in the name of artists. Great Kathakali artists like Kudamaloor Karunakaran Nair, Kuroor Vasudevan Nampoothiry (Vesham), Mathoor Govindankutty, Kuroor Cheriya Vasudevan Nampoothiry (Chenda), famous flute maestro Kudamaloor Janardhanan etc. to name a few.

Thirunakkara Heritage
Thirunakkara in the heart of Kottayam is the cultural center of Kottayam. The town itself is developed around the Sri Mahadeva temple at Thirunakkara. 
The 'Koothambalam', which is the dance hall in the temple is one of the rare ones in Kerala. The ornate walls of the sanctum sanctorum of the temple is worth mentioning. There are many small temples nearby - namely the Thirunakkara Sri Krishna Temple, Thirunakkara Puthiyathrikkovil Mahavishnu Temple, Thirunakkara Cheruvallikkavu Devi Temple, Thirunakkara Swamiyar Madom and the adjoining Sri Rama-Hanuman temple, Thirunakkara Brahamana Samooha Madom Aiyappa temple etc.

Smaller temples
Other temples located in the city or close to the city are Nagampadom Mahadeva Temple, Tiruvatta Sree Rama-Hanuman temple, Pandavam Dharma Shastha temple, Pandavam, Subrahmnaya swami temple, Vedagairi Sri Rama-Laxmna temple, Pakkil Sri Dharmashatha temple, Manganam Sri Narasimha Swami Temple, Aymanam Sri Narasimha Swami temple etc.

Churches in Kottayam
Kottayam is a major center for Saint Thomas Christians in Kerala. Kottayam is the headquarters of the Malankara Orthodox Syrian Church. Their Pazhaya (old) seminary was founded in Kottayam in the year CE 1811, after the destruction of centuries old seminary (priest training centre) at Ankamaly by Tipu sultan on his military raids. The Mar Thoma Theological Seminary of Marthoma Syrian Christians is functioning at Kottayam along with Marthoma School popularly known as MT School. Anglican Church of India headquarters is in Kurichi, near Kottayam.

Large number of  C S I Christians are present in Kottayam. Madhya Kerala diocese of church of south India ( c s i) is headquartered at Kottayam. It is the one of the oldest and largest C S I diocese. It run large number of famous institutions like CMS college, Baker school.  C S I run large number of education institutions in kottayam and they are known as pioneers in educational culture of Kottayam and Kerala.. C S I Christians in Kottayam include large number of dalit Christians and Syrian Christians and they are a prominent part of Christians in Kottayam..
The Malankara Jacobite Syriac Orthodox Church has Prominent Position in Kottayam District. The Most famous pilgrim center Manarcad Church situated near at Kottayam City.

Valiya Palli
Kottayam Valiya Palli of Knanaya Community of Malankara Jacobite Syriac Orthodox Church (Kottayam Big Church) was built in 1550 by Knanaya Syrian Christians who immigrated from Kaduthuruthy, and is considered the first Christian church in Kottayam town. This church is famous for its two Persian crosses made of granite. There are rare antique carvings and mural paintings behind the main altar and on the ceiling of the church. Another St. Mary's Church known as Cheria Palli (the Little Church), belonging to the Malankara Orthodox Church was built in 1579 by the Raja of Thekkumkur for his Christian subjects. These churches feature temple architectural influences. The interior murals, painted using vegetable dyes, depict Biblical themes.
The Syro-Malabar Catholic Church has an archeparchy based in Kottayam. Some of the important Syrian Catholic churches in Kottayam include Christ the King Syro-Malabar Catholic Cathedral of Kottayam Knanaya Archdiocese and Lourde's Syro-Malabar Catholic Forane Church. Important Latin Catholic churches are Good Shepherd Church and Vimalagiri Cathedral. Pope John Paul II visited Kottayam and met Catholicose of the East at Eliya Cathedral during his visit to India in 1986. In Kottayam he announced the beatification of Kuriakose Elias Chavara and Sister Alphonsa, who hail from Kottayam district.

Mosques and Dargahs
Thazhathangady Juma Masjid, situated in the banks of river Meenachil, in Kummanam, is one of the oldest mosques in India and is more than 1,000 years old, famous for its architectural beauty, and richness in wood carvings. This mosque was constructed by the followers of the Islamic prophet Muhammad during one of their first voyages to Kerala.